Andrew Elliot (November 1728 – 25 May 1797)  was a British merchant and official who served as the Acting and last British Governor of New York in 1783.

Early life
Elliot was born November 1728 in Edinburgh, the son of Sir Gilbert Elliot, 2nd Baronet of Minto and the former Helen Steuart (1696–1774). He was a brother of Gilbert, John, and Jean Elliot.

His paternal grandparents were Sir Gilbert Elliot, 1st Baronet, of Minto and Dame Jane Carre (the fourth daughter of Sir Andrew Carre of Cavers, Roxborough). His maternal grandparents were Sir Robert Steuart, 1st Baronet, of Allanbank, and, his second wife, Helen Cockburn (a daughter of Sir Alexander Cockburn of Langton). His maternal uncle was Archibald Stewart, Lord Provost of Edinburgh.

Career
He arrived in Pennsylvania in 1746 as an apprentice and established himself as a trader. In 1762, he was elected a member of the board of trustees of the College of Philadelphia. In 1763, he was appointed collector of the port of New York and receiver general of New York. In 1764 he was appointed to the Province of New York executive council.

During the American Revolution he remained a Loyalist. A few days after the declaration of independence he left New York City for Perth Amboy for his safety. He returned to New York City after the British reoccupation. On 1 May 1777 he was appointed the head of the military court of police and on 17 July the superintendent of all imports and exports. In 1780 he was appointed lieutenant governor of the Province of New York. In 1783 he was part of the delegation that met with George Washington at Tappan. He was the acting governor from April 1783 to November.

Later life
Elliot sent his family back to Scotland on the Nunsuch on July 9th, and then he left for Scotland in December 1783. After returning to Scotland, he was asked to serve as British Minister to America in 1790, but declined and held no further public offices.

Personal life
Elliot was twice married. His first marriage was in 1754 to Eleanor McCall, a daughter of George McCall and Anne ( Yeates) McCall of Philadelphia. Together, they were the parents of one child:

 Eleanor Elliot (–1830), who married James Jauncey Jr., a member of the New York General Assembly, in 1773. After his death, she married Admiral Robert Digby, MP for Wells, in 1784.

After the death of his first wife, he married Elisabeth Plumsted in 1760. She was a daughter of the Mayor of Philadelphia William Plumsted and, his first wife, Rebecca ( Kearney) Plumsted. After Elisabeth's mother died, her father William married Mary McCall, the sister of Elliot's first wife, making Elisabeth a step-daughter of his sister-in-law. Together, they were the parents of:

 Agnes Murray Elliot (1763–1860), who married Sir David Carnegie, 4th Baronet.
 Elizabeth Elliot (–1847), who married William Cathcart, 1st Earl Cathcart.

Elliot died at home on 25 May 1797 at Mount Teviot, Jedburgh, aged 68.

References

1728 births
1797 deaths
British officials in the American Revolution
Colonial American merchants
Governors of the Province of New York
Politicians from Edinburgh
University of Pennsylvania people
Younger sons of baronets
Members of the New York Executive Council